Werner Schwier (born 28 May 1921 in Stadthagen; died 3 May 1982 in Munich) was a German actor, voice actor, and television presenter.

Career
Werner Schwier made a name for himself in silent films on German television. On 14 May 1961 to September 1965, he presented 65 episodes of Hessischer Rundfunk and produced the series Es darf gelacht werden (It is permitted to laugh). The show was a 45 minutes long evening program of the ARD. During the broadcast, three complete short films would be shown. He also had two silent film stars on the show as guests, Buster Keaton in 1962 and Harold Lloyd in 1963.

In the manner of a small film show of the times of the silent films, Schwier presented in a checkered suit, assisted by Konrad Elfers on the Piano and Géza Janós on violin. Before each short film, he would say "I present now, the symbol---assuming the operator approves.", this was followed by a flying bowler hat on screen, to mark the start of the show.

Silent films played only a role on Schwier's afternoon show, which showed only the funny material of the era of silent films. He obtained, with the show, viewers ratings over 80 percent. Schwier added presentation with appropriate dry-humour to the shows, that was not as chaotic as his English counterpart Bob Monkhouse in 1966 with Mad Movies or the later Vater der Klamotte with the corny jokes of Hanns Dieter Hüsch.

He was also a guest on the programme Kennen Sie Kino? mit Hellmut Lange.

Filmography

References 
 Hörzu, Issue 24 Volume 7. February 1970, Page 39: „Ist Herr Schwier auch schwierig?“

Websites 

 Quellen zur Filmgeschichte, Book 47 (21. November 1968 - 2. Januar 1969)
 Werner Schwier on Synchrondatenbank.de
 History for Sale - Buster Keaton und Werner Schwier auf einem Autogrammfoto

1921 births
1982 deaths
People from Stadthagen
German male film actors
German television presenters
20th-century German male actors